Howsham is a village in the civil parish of Cadney in North Lincolnshire, England.

Villages in the Borough of North Lincolnshire